Louise Popelin (1850–1937), was a Belgian pharmacist. 

She became one of the first women to be accepted at the Université libre de Bruxelles in 1880 and thus one of the first female students in Belgium alongside Emma Leclercq and Marie Destrée. She took her pharmacy degree in 1887.

References

1850 births
1937 deaths
Belgian pharmacists
Women pharmacists
19th-century Belgian women scientists